Brad Daugherty may refer to:

Brad Daugherty (basketball) (born 1965), American NBA player, currently a television sportscaster
Brad Daugherty (poker player) (born 1951), American poker player